Nicolas Lake Scott Minnerath (born August 11, 1988) is an American professional basketball player for the Shabab Al Ahli of the UAE National Basketball League. He played college basketball for Jackson Community College and the University of Detroit Mercy.

High school career
Minnerath attended Nauset Regional High School in North Eastham, Massachusetts. After playing sparingly as a junior, just two games into his senior year, he broke his leg and missed the rest of the season.

College career
In his freshman season at Jackson Community College, Minnerath finished runner-up in the Western Conference's Player of the Year award after averaging 22.8 points and 9.1 rebounds, including setting the school record with 42 points in a game against Kirkland C.C. Minnerath made 15 2-pointers and 4 3-pointers in the victory.

In his sophomore season, he finished 19th in the nation in points per game (21.0), 16th in free throw percentage (82%) and 15th in blocks per game (2.24). A 1,000-point scorer at the JUCO level, he also earned back-to-back Michigan Community College Athletic Association (MCCAA) All-Region honors as well as first team All-Western Conference accolades. He capped off an impressive two-year career at Jackson by being named a NJCAA Division II third team All-American.

In 2010, he transferred to Detroit Mercy where he started every game in his first year, finishing the 2010–11 season with a hot stretch, as he had six 20-point games starting on January 1, 2011. In 33 games, he averaged 11.2 points and 4.8 rebounds in 27.6 minutes per game.

Minnerath redshirted his senior year after playing just five games before a knee injury ended his season. In those five games, he averaged 12.0 points and 4.0 rebounds in 23.2 minutes per game.

In his redshirted senior season, he was named to the 2013 All-Horizon League first team. He was also named to the NABC District 12 second team and was one of 64 outgoing seniors to be invited to the 2013 Portsmouth Invitational Tournament. In 33 games, he averaged 14.6 points, 5.9 rebounds and 1.0 assists in 29.6 minutes per game.

Professional career

Obradoiro (2013–14)
After going undrafted in the 2013 NBA draft, Minnerath joined the Sacramento Kings for the 2013 NBA Summer League. On August 30, 2013, he signed with Obradoiro CAB of Spain for the 2013–14 season. On January 13, 2014, he parted ways with Obradoiro. In 15 games, he averaged 6.0 points, 2.2 rebounds and 0.2 assists per game.

Le Havre (2014)
On January 14, 2014, Minnerath signed with STB Le Havre of France for the rest of the season. In 15 games, he averaged 11.9 points, 2.1 rebounds and 1.0 assists per game.

Cholet Basket (2014–15)
In July 2014, Minnerath joined the Brooklyn Nets for the 2014 NBA Summer League. On July 25, 2014, he signed with Cholet Basket for the 2014–15 season. In 34 games, he averaged 13.6 points, 4.1 rebounds and 0.6 assists per game.

Cleveland Cavaliers / Canton Charge (2015–16)
On September 28, 2015, Minnerath signed with the Cleveland Cavaliers. However, he was later waived by the Cavaliers on October 22 after appearing in three preseason games. On October 30, he was acquired by the Canton Charge of the NBA Development League as an affiliate player of the Cavaliers. On November 14, he made his debut for the Charge in a 106–99 loss to the Maine Red Claws, recording 17 points, 10 rebounds and one block in 38 minutes. At the season's end, he was named to the All-NBA D-League Second Team after playing in 49 games and averaging 18.5 points on .508 shooting and 6.9 rebounds in 29.9 minutes per game, helping the Charge tie a franchise record 31 wins.

Avtodor Saratov (2016–17)
On July 15, 2016, Minnerath signed with the Russian team Avtodor Saratov. Minnerath had an outstanding scoring season, as he was crowned the VTB United League Scoring Champion, after averaging 23.3 points per game during the 2016–17 season. To go along with this accomplishment, he was also the scoring leader of the European-wide 3rd-tier level Basketball Champions League's 2016–17 season, with an average of 20.3 points per game.

Shanghai Sharks (2017–18)
On July 18, 2017, Minnerath signed with the Shanghai Sharks of the Chinese Basketball Association.
Minnerath with Jimmer Fredette (other American import) led the Sharks to the playoffs. They were defeated by the Beijing Ducks in the first round.
Minnerath was one of top two players in points scored per minute. He averaged 27.9 points in 29 minutes of play. He shot .490 from 2 point area, an eye popping 46% from three, and .873 from the line. Minnerath also led team in rebounds with 8.5 per game. 
Very successful first year in China for Minnerath.

Xinjiang Flying Tigers (2018–present)
On November 15, 2018, Minnerath was reported to have signed with Xinjiang Flying Tigers.
Minnerath left Xinjiang-Flying-Tigers of the CBA in December of his own choice to play in BSN in Puerto Rico. This allowed him to be closer to his new child in Florida.

Leones de Ponce (2019-present)
On January 12, 2019, Minnerath was reported to have signed with Leones de Ponce [Baloncesto Superior National] (BSN). Minnerath was a first team All-Star for the BSN.  He also was the league's leading scorer with an average of 21.9 points per game. On July 16, 2019 he officially signed with the Seoul Samsung Thunders of the KBL (Korean Basketball League).

Seoul Samsung Thunders (2019-2020)

Minnerath signed with Seoul Samsung Thunders of the Korean Basketball League (KBL) last July 16, 2019. He quickly became one of best new players in the competitive league. Minnerath led team with averaging 21 points and 6 rebounds per game. He was second leading scorer in the league. The world wide pandemic covid-19 ended the league about a month early. Minnerath played all teams 43 games. He was named player of week a few times and top 5 players in round 4 {last round of 10 games}. Minnerath shot 61%  from the 2 point floor and 84% from the line. Unable to finish season there were no playoffs this year. Korea, like all other Basketball was not able to finish their seasons. Korea was able to play most of their regular season games compared to most leagues. Minnerath had another great year playing in the new country of Korea for him. Once again showing he is one of the game's most high caliber offensive players. Korean League called the season on March 27, 2020.

Seoul SK Knights (2020-2021)
Minnerath signed with Seoul SK Knights of the Korean Basketball League (KBL) on June 8, 2020. He averaged 13.4 points and 4.3 rebounds per game. Minnerath was Korean Basketball league leader with points per minute (PPM). He led the league averaging  .9 points per minute played (13.4 points in 15.0 minutes played).

Shabab Al Ahli (2021-Present)
On September 6, 2021, Minnerath signed with Shabab Al Ahli of the UAE National Basketball League.

Shabab Al Ahli won the league championship on March 23, 2022 by defeating Al Sharjah by a score of 75-63. Shabab Al Ahli  finished the season by winning the “Triple Crown” by winning both the President's Cup and the Vice President's Cup. Minnerath led his team averaging over 20 points per game and 9 rebounds. He resigned for the 2022-2023 with Shabab Al Ahli. Minnerath once again had a great year in a different part of the world as his career continues to flourish.

Personal
Minnerath is the son of Marie Scott and Michael Minnerath, the latter a Cape Cod National Seashore Ranger, and has a twin sister named Jessica.

Minnerath married Valeria (Lera) Kulikuskaya on January 2, 2015. She is a tennis player from Belarus. They have a 4 year old son named Miles.

References

External links
Eurobasket.com profile
Detroit Mercy Titans bio

1989 births
Living people
American expatriate basketball people in China
American expatriate basketball people in France
American expatriate basketball people in Russia
American expatriate basketball people in South Korea
American expatriate basketball people in Spain
American men's basketball players
Basketball players from Wyoming
BC Avtodor Saratov players
Canton Charge players
Cholet Basket players
Detroit Mercy Titans men's basketball players
Liga ACB players
Obradoiro CAB players
People from Cody, Wyoming
Power forwards (basketball)
Seoul Samsung Thunders players
Shanghai Sharks players
STB Le Havre players
Xinjiang Flying Tigers players
Shabab Al Ahli Basket players